Anton Elbel (6 January 1834 – 3 October 1912) was an Austrian engineer and locomotive designer.

Anton Elbel was born in Vienna on 6 January 1834 and attended the Polytechnic Institute there. In 1856 he started work for the Carinthian Railway (Kärntner Bahn). When this was absorbed by the Austrian Southern Railway, or Südbahn, he transferred with it and worked in the Südbahn design office in Vienna from 1860 to 1867.

Following that he was the inspector of general operations for the construction of the Hungarian Western Railway for several years. From 1872 to 1892 he worked for the Austrian Northwest Railway, finishing as central inspector and president of the design office.

Together with Louis Adolf Gölsdorf he designed the so-called Gepäcklokomotive, an economical form of locomotive with a luggage compartment that saw service on several Austro-Hungarian railways.

He died on 3 October 1912 in Baden, Lower Austria.

See also
 List of railway pioneers

References

1834 births
1912 deaths
Austrian railway pioneers
Austrian railway mechanical engineers
Scientists from Vienna
TU Wien alumni